Mulazai is an administrative unit, known as Union council, of Tank District in the Khyber Pakhtunkhwa province of Pakistan.

District Tank has 1 Tehsils i.e. Tank. Each tehsil comprises certain numbers of union councils. There are 16 union councils in district Tank.

See also 

 Tank District

External links
United Nations
Hajjinfo.org Uploads
PBS paiman.jsi.com

Tank District
Populated places in Tank District
Union councils of Khyber Pakhtunkhwa
Union Councils of Tank District